Robert Michael Hecht (born 1953) is an American global health policy and financing expert. Hecht is currently Founder and President of Pharos Global Health Advisors. He has previously held positions with the World Bank, UNAIDS, the International AIDS Vaccine Initiative, and Results for Development Institute. He serves as a lecturer at Yale University’s Jackson Institute for Global Affairs and is a clinical professor at the Yale School of Public Health. He has published on a range of topics in global health and development, with a special focus on the economics, financing, and policies for infectious diseases (HIV, Hepatitis C, malaria), nutrition, and broader health system reform.  He has been an advisor to the President's Emergency Plan for AIDS Relief (PEPFAR), the World Health Organization, and UNITAID. Hecht holds a BA from Yale and a PhD from Cambridge University.

Personal life

Hecht was born in Cambridge, Massachusetts and is the son of Amalie Kass (nee Moses) and the late Malcolm Hecht Jr.

Hecht’s father was founder and president of the Unitrode Corporation, a manufacturer of high-performance semiconductors, capacitors and other electronic components, which was acquired by Texas Instruments in 1999. His stepfather, Dr. Edward H. Kass, was William Ellery Channing Professor at the Harvard Medical School before his death in 1990.  His mother is a medical historian who holds a Research Associate position at the Countway Library, Harvard Medical School, and has served as Chair of the Board of Trustees of the Massachusetts Historical Society and is a Trustee of Wellesley College.

His uncle Alfred H. Moses was a law partner at Covington and Burling and is a former US ambassador to Romania.  His brother Jon Hecht is a Massachusetts State Representative.

Professional life

World Bank

After earning his PhD, Hecht joined the World Bank in 1981. There, he was part of the core team that produced the landmark 1993 World Development Report: Investing in Health. In the mid-1990s he led the Bank’s efforts to assist Latin American countries, including Argentina, with reform of their health insurance systems. In 2002, Hecht was the main author for the Bank’s Health, Nutrition, and Population Sector Strategy. While at the World Bank he also served on the boards of the GAVI vaccine alliance, Stop TB Partnership, and the Global Forum for Health Research.

UNAIDS

From 1998-2001, Hecht served as Director of the Department of Policy, Strategy, and Research at the United Nations Joint Program on HIV/AIDS. There, he helped to design and implement UNAIDS strategy to document the links between HIV and poverty, economic growth, and social progress, and to advocate for increased investment in responding to HIV in low- and middle-income countries. While at UNAIDS he managed headquarters and regionally-based technical teams for Africa and Asia.

International AIDS Vaccine Initiative

Hecht held the position of Senior Vice President of Public Policy at the International AIDS Vaccine Initiative (IAVI) from 2004-2008. He directed IAVI’s department for policy research and advocacy, focusing on analysis of the potential economic impact of an AIDS vaccine and of options for innovative financing and incentives for new health technologies of neglected diseases.

Results for Development Institute (R4D)

During his eight years at R4D, Hecht worked as Managing Director and oversaw policy research and advisory services on the long-term financing of the global response to HIV/AIDS, immunization policy, malaria, nutrition, global health research and development, and health financing reform.  His teams produced a series of reports that helped to influence HIV, immunization, and other policies in several countries and in global health initiatives including GAVI and the Global Fund to Fight AIDS, Tuberculosis and Malaria.

Yale University

Since August 2014, Hecht has served as Lecturer and Fellow at the Jackson Institute for Global Affairs. In May 2017 he was appointed as a Clinical Professor at the Yale School of Public Health. There, he teaches in global health and conducts policy research. Since 2011 he has been a member of the Dean’s Leadership Council at the Yale School of Public Health. He has established a Global Health Pilot Innovation Award for Junior Faculty, which is granted to those who hope to advance new research and educational projects in global health.

Pharos Global Health

In May 2016, Hecht founded Pharos Global Health Advisors, whose mission is to improve global health outcomes by applying analytics and policy dialogue so that international leaders make sound and efficient decisions in the allocation of scarce resources in health and nutrition. Focus areas include scaling up Hepatitis and other disease control efforts, implementation of new models for community-based primary care, design of effective structures for expanding national malnutrition programs, and assessment of opportunities for integrated delivery of adolescent health services with vaccination.

Selected works

Hecht is the co-author of a wide range of scholarly papers and books related to immunization, HIV, health financing, health sector reform, and nutrition. Early in his career he authored newspaper articles on international development, which have been published in The International Herald Tribune, Financial Times, The Guardian, Washington Post, Boston Globe, and Christian Science Monitor.

Selected works include:

 Defeating AIDS - Advancing Global Health
 Funding AIDS Programmes in the Era of Shared Responsibility: an Analysis of Domestic Spending in 12 Low-Income and Middle-Income Countries
 Overcoming Challenges to Sustainable Immunization Financing: Early Experiences From GAVI Graduating Countries
 Financing of HIV/AIDS Programme Scale Up in Low-Income and Middle-Income Countries, 2009-31
 Critical Choices in Financing the Response to the Glob8  HIV/AIDS Pandemic
 Improving Health R&D Financing for Developing Countries: A Menu of Innovative Policy Options
 Estimating Demand for a Preventative AIDS Vaccine – Why We Need to Do Better
 1993 World Development Report: Investing in Health

References

1953 births
Living people
American company founders
People from Cambridge, Massachusetts